The 2015 Mole Valley District Council election took place on 7 May 2015 to elect approximately one-third of members to Mole Valley District Council in England coinciding with other local elections held simultaneously with a general election which resulted in increased turnout compared to the election four years before.  Some two-member wards such as Holmwoods did not hold a local election in this year, being contested in even-numbered years.

Results
Conservatives gained four seats, giving the group overall control of the Council, from a previous state of no party group exercising overall control.

Ward by ward

References

2015 English local elections
May 2015 events in the United Kingdom
2015
2010s in Surrey